Bystron, Bystroń or Bystroň is a Polish (Bystroń) and Czech (Bystroň) surname. It is derived either from Czech bystrý or Polish bystry, both with the meaning "quick, alert, bright." People with the name include:
 David Bystroň (1982–2017), Czech football player
 Jan Bystroń (linguist) (1860–1902), Polish linguist
 Jan Stanisław Bystroń (1892–1964), Polish sociologist and ethnographer
 Petr Bystron (born 1972), German politician of Czech descent

References

See also
 

Czech-language surnames
Polish-language surnames
Surnames from nicknames